Boletus bainiugan is a species of porcini-like fungus native to Henan, Sichuan and Yunnan Provinces in Central and Southwestern China, where it grows under Pinus yunnanensis, Pinus kesiya and Castanea mollissima. It is closely related to Boletus reticulatus.

The epiphet bainiugan is the Hanyu Pinyin transcription of the fungus's Mandarin name,  "white porcini". The other epiphet meiweiniuganjun likewise is a transcription of  "delicious porcini", a name originally used to translate the epiphet of Boletus edulis.

References

bainiugan
Fungi of China
Fungi described in 2013